Landgrave George III of Hesse-Itter (29 September 1632 in Darmstadt – 19 July 1676 in Hof Lauterbach, now part of Vöhl) was the second son of Landgrave George II of Hesse-Darmstadt and his wife Sophia Eleonore of Saxony (1609–1671). Since he left no male heir, Hesse-Itter fell back to Hesse-Darmstadt.

Marriages and issue 
 Georg married on 5 May 1661 to Duchess Dorothea Auguste (30 September 1636 – 18 September 1662), the daughter of John Christian, Duke of Schleswig-Holstein-Sonderburg and Countess Anna of Oldenburg-Delmenhorst. She died after giving birth her only child:
 Stillborn daughter (18 September 1662 in Vöhl)
 After Dorothea's death, he married on 21 July 1667 to Juliane Alexandrine of Leiningen-Heidenheim (21 August 1651 – 1 April 1703), the daughter of the Count Emich XIII of Leiningen and Countess Dorothea of Waldeck-Wildungen (1617-1661).  After George's death, she married Landgrave Charles of Hesse-Wanfried. With her, George had three daughters:
 Sophie Juliane (17 July 1668 in Vöhl – 9 August 1668 in Vöhl)
 Eleanore (15 August 1669 in Vöhl – 4 September 1714 in Darmstadt)
 Magdalene Sibylle (14 October 1671 in Vöhl – 21 April 1720 in Bernstadt)

References

External links 
 
 

House of Hesse
Landgraves of Hesse
1632 births
1676 deaths